Lwando Manase (born 27 December 1984) is a South African former cricketer. He played in one first-class and one List A match for Border in 2005. His batting style is Right-Hand bat and his bowling style is Right-Arm Fast.

References

External links
 

1984 births
Living people
South African cricketers
Border cricketers
Sportspeople from Qonce